Robert Douglas Meuleman (born 6 September 1949 in Melbourne) was a Western Australian cricketer who played 14 first-class matches for Western Australia between 1968 and 1972.

Of partial German ancestry, his father, Ken Meuleman was also a first-class cricketer (played 1 test for Australia) and son Scott Meuleman is also a first-class cricketer playing for Western Australia. He was the batting coach of former Australia wicket-keeper/batsman Adam Gilchrist. He is credited with giving Gilchrist the idea to bat with a squash ball in his batting gloves. Meuleman won the Australia State Junior Championships in 1967 & 1968 in squash.

See also
 List of Western Australia first-class cricketers

References

External links
 

1949 births
Living people
Western Australia cricketers
Australian cricketers
Cricketers from Melbourne
Australian people of German descent